Borsky (masculine), Borskaya (feminine), or Borskoye (neuter) is a surname. Notable persons with that name include:
Alexandre Borsky, pseudonym of Joe D'Amato (1936–1999) and Claudio Bernabei, Italian filmmaker
Rex Borsky, pseudonym of Alex de Renzy, American director and producer
Peer Borsky (born 1990), Swiss épée fencer

See also
Borskoye, several rural localities in Russia
Borski